A Child's Adventure is the tenth album by British singer Marianne Faithfull, released on Island Records in 1983.

Background and recording
After two albums with Mark Mundy as producer, Marianne Faithfull recorded A Child's Adventure without a separate producer; the album was produced by backing musicians Wally Badarou and Barry Reynolds and engineer Harvey Goldberg. In an interview following the album's recording, she remarked, "On this album, because we didn't have a producer as such, we could really work closely together on the finer bits - the harmonics, which a producer often doesn't have the time for."

Faithfull had been performing "She's Got a Problem", a poem written by Caroline Blackwood and put to music by Faithfull's then-husband Ben Brierley, since 1978.

Track listing

Personnel
 Marianne Faithfull – vocals
 Barry Reynolds – vocals, guitar
 Ben Brierley – vocals, guitar
 Wally Badarou – vocals, keyboards
 Mikey Chung – guitar
 Fernando Saunders – bass
 Terry Stannard – drums
 Rafael de Jesus – percussion

Charts

References

1983 albums
Marianne Faithfull albums
Albums produced by Wally Badarou
Island Records albums